Platt College may refer to:

Platt College (Colorado), a vocational school in Aurora, Colorado
Platt College (San Diego), a design school in San Diego, California